Abdul Hye Mashreki (1 April 1919 – 4 December 1988) was a Bangladeshi folk litterateur and poet. He is known for his writing in the 1930s and 1940s. He mainly focused the lifestyle of the rural people of Bengal. Some notable works of him include Rakhal Bondhu, Jarina Sundari, Allah Megh De Chaya De, Fande Poriya Boga Kande Re, Amar Kakher Kolshi, He Amar Desh and Kichu Rekhe Jete Chai.

Mashreki wrote against the social, economical, religious and racial discrimination in the rural area. Mihir Acarya, researcher of Bengali literature named three main folk poets – Mashreki, Jasimuddin and Bande Ali Mia – in his research in the time period of 1917 to 1936.

Birth and education 
Mashreki was born in the village of Kakonhati of Ishwarganj Upazila in Mymensingh District on 1 April 1919 in his maternal uncle's house His father Osman Gani was an active worker of the movement against Jamindar and his mother was Rahima Khatun. Earlier of his education, he studied intermediate education at Ananda Mohan College of Mymensingh. Later, he moved on to Kolkata.

Works 
Poetry
 Kichu Rekhe Jete Chai
 He Amar Desh
 Mather Kobita Mather Gaan
 Vatiyali
 Ovishopter Bani
 Desh Desh Nondita
 Kal Nirobodhi
 Hazrat Abu Bakr (R.A)
 Swadesher Proti Hazrat Muhammad (Sm) Hutum Vutum RatriStory
 Kulsum Baul Moner Naksha Manush O Lash Nodee VangeDrama
 Notun Gayer Kahini SankoPala Gaan
 Rakhal Bondhu Jarina SundariJari Gaan
 Dukhu Miar JariOthers
 Dal Dhoriya Nuyaiya Konnya Akash Keno Nil''

References 

1919 births
1988 deaths
People from Mymensingh District
Bangladeshi male poets
Bangladeshi male writers
Indian poets
Pakistani poets